Tim Brando (born February 27, 1956) is an American sportscaster with Fox Sports. Formerly with CBS Sports, Raycom Sports, ESPN and SiriusXM, Brando has primarily covered NCAA football, basketball and the NBA. Along with radio duties, Brando has also served as a studio host for games, a play-by-play announcer, and halftime host.

Career

Early career
In 1976 Brando was a disc jockey at radio station KROK-FM in his native Shreveport, Louisiana. From 1981 to 1986, Brando was the assistant sports director at WAFB-TV in Baton Rouge; he did telecasts of Louisiana State University men's and women's basketball on Tigervision.

ESPN
From 1986 to 1994, he served as a studio host for SportsCenter, for ESPN's college football halftime show, and for the network's coverage of the NCAA Men's Basketball Championship. In 1994, he provided play-by-play for TNT's coverage of the NBA Playoffs. Brando also called Atlanta Hawks and Atlanta Braves games for SportSouth. Brando also auditioned for the daytime version of Wheel of Fortune after Pat Sajak resigned to concentrate on his self-titled talk show.  Ultimately, the hosting job went to Rolf Benirschke.

CBS
In 1996, Brando joined CBS Sports and began calling NCAA Men's Division I Basketball Championship games. Three years later, he added hosting duties on College Football Today, which is the broadcast network home of SEC football. He also provided play-by-play for the NFL on CBS from 1998 to 2003.

Brando called the four first round games in Tampa, Florida, during the 2008 NCAA Men's Division I Basketball Tournament where for the first time ever, all four lower seeded teams won in the same venue on the same day.

Fox
On June 25, 2014, Fox Sports announced that it had hired Brando to serve as a play-by-play voice for college football and college basketball games on Fox and Fox Sports 1 starting in fall 2014. He was also named as a backup NFL announcer for Fox in October of that year. He called an NFL game for Fox on October 19, 2014 in a game between the Minnesota Vikings at the Buffalo Bills.

In addition to his network duties, Brando calls games for Raycom's coverage of the Atlantic Coast Conference basketball telecasts. Brando also hosts Raycom's Emmy Award-winning show, "Football Saturdays."

Broadcasting partners
Spencer Tillman
Tony Barnhart
Lou Holtz
Mike Gminski

Personal life

Brando's father, Hub Brando, was a broadcaster at radio station KCIJ in Shreveport. Tim Brando graduated in 1974 from Fair Park High School in Shreveport. He then attended Northeast Louisiana University in Monroe (now the University of Louisiana at Monroe).  He resides in Shreveport with his wife of 41 years, Terri Glorioso Brando. The couple has two daughters: Tiffany Brando Crews, 37, who attended Louisiana State University; and Tara Brando Sullivan, 29, who graduated from Ole Miss. Brando welcomed his first grandchild, Wilma Scarlett Sullivan, on September 7, 2016 and his first grandson, Spencer Brando Crews, on June 28, 2017. Spencer was named after Brando's colleague and close family friend, Spencer Tillman.

References

Carolina Panthers announcers
Living people
American sports radio personalities
American television sports announcers
Atlanta Braves announcers
Atlanta Hawks announcers
College basketball announcers in the United States
College football announcers
LSU Lady Tigers basketball announcers
LSU Tigers basketball announcers
Major League Baseball broadcasters
National Basketball Association broadcasters
National Football League announcers
New Orleans Saints announcers
People from Tarrytown, New York
Fair Park High School alumni
Women's college basketball announcers in the United States
University of Louisiana at Monroe alumni
People from Baton Rouge, Louisiana
Golf writers and broadcasters
1956 births